Pietro Pettoletti (ca. 1795 – ca. 1870) was a composer of Italian origins. The dates of birth and death are not known. His father Carl Johan (1758–1801) was kapellmeister in Christiania (Norway). At first he lived in Germany, then, from age 25, in Sweden, where he taught piano and guitar. Subsequently, he moved to Russia, employed by a wealthy landowner to teach guitar to his children. Pettoletti stayed for a long time in Saint Petersburg, where he gained a reputation as concert performer and teacher.

He often performed in duo with his brother Joachim, a violinist in the orchestra of the Italian opera of Saint Petersburg. As guitar virtuoso Pettoletti toured Germany, France, and Russia.

Works
 Six Waltzes op. 1 (Bonn & Cologne, Simrock)
 Mes Souvenirs. Divertissemens op. 6 (Stockholm: Gjöthström & Magnusson)
 Variations sur l'air la Tyrolienne op. 7 (Stockholm: Gjöthström & Magnusson)
 Six Variations faciles op. 8
 Theme with variations op.11a (Mainz: B. Schott's Söhne)
 Divertissement facile op. 11b, for 2 guitars (Copenhagen: Lose)
 Troika op. 14
 Fantaisie op. 15 (Mainz: B. Schott's Söhne)
 Divertissement op. 17
 Fantaisie 'God bless the Tzar!''' op. 18
 Fantaisie 'The Red Safran' op. 19
 How have I made you sad? Variations op. 21
 Fantaisie op. 22 (Hamburg: Cranz)
 Vals. Marsch och 2 tema op. 23
 Fantaisie op. 24 (Hamburg: Cranz)
 Variations sur la Cavatine favorite de l'opéra 'Le Pirata' de Bellini op. 26 (Mainz: B. Schott's Söhne)
 Fantaisie op. 28
 Impromptu op. 29
 Fantaisie sur une romance op. 31
 Fantaisie sur une mélodie'' op. 32

References

External links
 
‘Pietro Pettoletti’, JustClassicalGuitar.com.

1790s births
1870s deaths
19th-century classical composers
Composers for the classical guitar
Italian classical composers
Italian classical guitarists
Italian male guitarists
Italian emigrants to Russia
Italian male classical composers
Italian Romantic composers
19th-century Italian male musicians
19th-century guitarists